Manuel Oseas Rodas Ochoa (born 5 July 1984) is a Guatemalan cyclist, that represented Guatemala at the Olympics in road cycling, in 2012, 2016 and 2020.

Major results

2005
 3rd Overall Vuelta a El Salvador
2006
 1st Stage 11 Vuelta a Guatemala
 7th Time trial, Central American and Caribbean Games
2007
 1st Stage 11 Vuelta a Guatemala
2008
 1st Stage 11 Vuelta Ciclista a Costa Rica
 5th Overall Vuelta a Guatemala
 6th Overall Vuelta al Ecuador
2009
 10th Overall Vuelta a Guatemala
1st Stage 9
2010
 1st  Time trial, National Road Championships
2012
 1st  Time trial, National Road Championships
 1st Stage 8 Vuelta a Guatemala
2013
 Central American Games
1st  Time trial
2nd  Road race
 1st  Time trial, National Road Championships
 1st Stage 2 Ruta del Centro
 3rd  Points race, Pan American Track Championships
2014
 1st  Time trial, National Road Championships
 Central American and Caribbean Games
3rd  Road race
4th Time trial
2015
 National Road Championships
1st  Road race
1st  Time trial
 Pan American Road Championships
2nd  Time trial
6th Road race
 3rd Overall Vuelta a Guatemala
1st Stage 1 (ITT)
 5th Time trial, Pan American Games
2016
 National Road Championships
1st  Road race
1st  Time trial
 2nd  Points race, Pan American Track Championships
 2nd Overall Vuelta a Guatemala
1st Stage 4 (ITT)
 7th Time trial, Pan American Road Championships
2017
 National Road Championships
1st  Time trial
2nd Road race
 1st Overall Vuelta a Guatemala
1st Stages 3b (TTT) & 6 (ITT)
 3rd  Time trial, Pan American Road Championships
2018
 1st  Time trial, National Road Championships
 2nd Overall Vuelta a Guatemala
1st Stage 5 (ITT)
 3rd  Time trial, Pan American Road Championships
 4th Time trial, Central American and Caribbean Games
2019
 National Road Championships
1st  Time trial
3rd Road race
 1st Overall Vuelta a Guatemala
1st Stage 5 (ITT)
 7th Time trial, Pan American Road Championships
 Pan American Games
8th Road race
9th Time trial
2020
 1st Stage 9 Vuelta a Guatemala
 3rd  Time trial, Central American Road Championships
2021
 1st  Time trial, National Road Championships
 Central American Road Championships
3rd  Time trial
7th Road race
 4th Time trial, Pan American Road Championships
2022
 1st  Time trial, National Road Championships
 5th Time trial, Pan American Road Championships

References

External links

Guatemalan male cyclists
1984 births
Olympic cyclists of Guatemala
Cyclists at the 2012 Summer Olympics
Cyclists at the 2016 Summer Olympics
Cyclists at the 2020 Summer Olympics
Living people
People from Quetzaltenango Department
Cyclists at the 2011 Pan American Games
Cyclists at the 2015 Pan American Games
Cyclists at the 2019 Pan American Games
Pan American Games competitors for Guatemala
21st-century Guatemalan people
Competitors at the 2006 Central American and Caribbean Games
Competitors at the 2014 Central American and Caribbean Games